This is a list of Colombian departments by population according to a general census taken in 2018, the 2005 census, and by estimates for 2020 made by the National Administrative Department of Statistics. The five most populous departments contain almost half of the total population.

See also
 Colombia
 Demographics of Colombia
 List of Colombian municipalities by population

References

DANE - censo regiones de Colombia
 

Departments by population

Colombia, population